Copanatoyac    is one of the 81 municipalities of Guerrero, in south-western Mexico. The municipal seat lies at Copanatoyac.  The municipality covers an area of 388.4 km².

As of 2005, the municipality had a total population of 17,337.

References

Municipalities of Guerrero